William Draper (12 November 1848 – 13 March 1919) was an English cricketer who played first-class cricket for Kent County Cricket Club from 1874 to 1880.

Draper was born at Penshurst in Kent in 1848. His name was registered at birth as William Drapper. In 1872 he appeared for a Colts of England cricket team and in 1873 represented a side comprising players engaged at Prince's Club.

In 1874 Draper made his first-class debut for Kent playing in their first county match against Derbyshire. He played nine first-class matches in total for the county as a left-handed batsman who bowled right-arm medium pace deliveries. Draper was a first-class umpire between 1887 and 1898. He died at Tunbridge Wells in Kent in 1919 aged 70.

References

External links

1848 births
1919 deaths
English cricketers
Kent cricketers
Sportspeople from Kent